Sebastian Barthold (born 27 August 1991) is a Norwegian handball player. He plays for Aalborg Håndbold and the Norwegian national team.

He represented Norway at the 2022 European Men's Handball Championship.

References

1991 births
Living people
Sportspeople from Bærum
Norwegian male handball players
Norwegian expatriate sportspeople in Denmark